Malik and Mahmud v Bank of Credit and Commerce International SA [1997] UKHL 23 is a leading English contract law and UK labour law case, which confirmed the existence of the implied term of mutual trust and confidence in all contracts of employment.

Facts
Mr Malik and Mr Mahmud both worked for the Bank of Credit and Commerce International. BCCI went insolvent due to massive fraud, connection with terrorists, money-laundering, extortion and a raft of other criminal activity on a global scale. Malik and Mahmud had both lost their jobs and they sought employment elsewhere. They could not find jobs. They sued the company for their loss of job prospects, alleging that their failure to secure new jobs was due to the reputational damage they had suffered from working with BCCI. Nobody, they said, wanted to hire people from a massive fraud operation like that at the company. This raised the question of what duty the company had owed to its employees that had been broken. Although there was no express term in their contracts, Malik and Mahmud argued there was an implied term in their employment contract that nothing would be done calculated to undermine mutual trust and confidence.

The House of Lords unanimously held that the term of mutual trust and confidence would be implied into the contract as a necessary incident of the employment relation. This was a term implied by law. Lord Nicholls said the following.

Lord Steyn said the term, as it had evolved, was a ‘sound development’. He continued.

The principle was not limited by any rule that an employee had to know of the breach while the employment relationship subsisted, since if that ‘were right it would mean that an employer who successfully concealed dishonest and corrupt practices before termination of the relationship cannot in law commit a breach of the implied obligation whereas the dishonest and corrupt employer who is exposed during the relationship can be held liable in damages.

See also

 Wilson v Racher
 Liverpool CC v Irwin
Commonwealth Bank of Australia v Barker [2014] HCA 32, High Court of Australia rejected a duty of mutual trust and confidence

Notes

References
 D Brodie, ‘Recent cases, Commentary, The heart of the Matter: Mutual Trust and Confidence’ (1996) 25 ILJ 121
E McGaughey, A Casebook on Labour Law (Hart 2019) ch 5, 221

United Kingdom labour case law
English contract case law
House of Lords cases
1997 in case law
1997 in British law
United Kingdom employment contract case law